Giovanni Francesco Zagordo (died 1599) was a Roman Catholic prelate who served as Bishop of Belcastro (1598–1599) and Bishop of Città Ducale (1593–1598).

Biography
On 7 April 1593, Giovanni Francesco Zagordo was appointed during the papacy of Pope Clement VIII as Bishop of Città Ducale.
On 23 February 1598, he was appointed during the papacy of Pope Clement VIII as Bishop of Belcastro.
He served as Bishop of Belcastro until his death in 1599.

See also 
Catholic Church in Italy

References

External links and additional sources
 (for Chronology of Bishops) 
 (for Chronology of Bishops) 
 (for Chronology of Bishops) 
 (for Chronology of Bishops) 

16th-century Italian Roman Catholic bishops
Bishops appointed by Pope Clement VIII
1599 deaths